Visual Culture in Britain is a triannual peer-reviewed academic journal covering visual culture in Great Britain published by Taylor & Francis. It is abstracted and indexed by the British Humanities Index and the International Index to the Performing Arts.

External links 
 

English-language journals
Art history journals
Taylor & Francis academic journals
Triannual journals
Publications established in 2000